LIX or Lix may refer to:

 59 (number), LIX in Roman numerals
 Lisa Lix (born 1966), Canadian health scientist and biostatistician
 Lycée International Xavier (LIX), a private school in Seoul, Korea
 Lix (readability test), a readability measure indicating the difficulty of reading a text
 Lix da Cunha (1896–1984), a Brazilian engineer and architect
 Lix Technologies, a Danish company and its platform for accessing textbooks
 Lix Toll, a road junction in Scotland